Svojkov is a municipality and village in Česká Lípa District in the Liberec Region of the Czech Republic. It has about 300 inhabitants.

Notable people
John of Chlum (before 1381 – before 1425), nobleman and friend of Jan Hus

References

Villages in Česká Lípa District
Lusatian Mountains